Cider Run is a tributary of Bowman Creek in Wyoming County, Pennsylvania, in the United States. The stream is not designated as an impaired waterbody. Its watershed is classified as Exceptional Value waters and a Migratory Fishery and the stream is designated as a Wilderness Trout Stream.

Course

Cider Run begins in a valley to the west of The Stack in Forkston Township, near the border between Wyoming County and Luzerne County. It flows northeast through the valley for several tenths of a mile before turning north-northeast. After a few tenths of a mile, the stream enters Noxen Township and a few tenths of a mile after that, it turns east-northeast, receiving an unnamed tributary from the left. Over the next several tenths of a mile, it flows around the northern edge of The Stack and turns southeast. The stream then turns south for several tenths of a mile, flowing along the eastern edge of The Stack, before turning southeast. A short distance further downstream, it reaches its confluence with Bowman Creek.

Tributaries
Cider Run has no named tributaries.

Hydrology
Cider Run is not designated as an impaired waterbody.

Geography and geology

The surficial geology in the vicinity of Cider Run mainly consists of alluvium, except in its upper reaches, where it consists of a till known as Wisconsinan Till. Wisconsinan Till occurs along the stream's valley throughout its length and is underlain by glacial lake clays in some reaches. Bedrock consisting of sandstone and shale occurs in the valley's higher elevations.

Cider Run flows through a glen that has an "interesting" rock face in one area.

Watershed

The stream is entirely within the United States Geological Survey quadrangle of Dutch Mountain. The streams mouth is near Mountain Springs.

Cider Run is a small, but relatively secluded stream. The stream has been described as a "trout trickle" that cannot be accessed directly from any road.

History and recreation
Cider Run was entered into the Geographic Names Information System on August 2, 1979. Its identifier in the Geographic Names Information System is 1198570.

Cider Run is situated within Pennsylvania State Game Lands Number 57. The High Knob Trail passes within sight of the stream's glen.

Biology
The drainage basin of Cider Run is designated as Exceptional Value waters and a Migratory Fishery. Wild trout naturally reproduce in the stream from its headwaters downstream to its mouth. The stream is also classified as a Wilderness Trout Stream with wild brook trout. It is one of two Wilderness Trout Streams in Wyoming County, the other being Sorber Run.

Cider Run has a substantial wild trout population.

See also
Sugar Run (Bowman Creek), next tributary of Bowman Creek going downstream
Butternut Run, next tributary of Bowman Creek going upstream
List of rivers of Pennsylvania
List of tributaries of Bowman Creek

References

Rivers of Wyoming County, Pennsylvania
Tributaries of Bowman Creek
Rivers of Pennsylvania